Arthur McBeath (17 June 1876 – 17 March 1945) was an Australian cricketer. He played twenty-eight first-class matches for New South Wales and South Australia between 1899/1900 and 1907/08.

See also
 List of New South Wales representative cricketers

References

External links
 

1876 births
1945 deaths
Australian cricketers
New South Wales cricketers
South Australia cricketers
Cricketers from Sydney